William Poundstone is an American author, columnist, and skeptic. He has written a number of books including the Big Secrets series and a biography of Carl Sagan.

Early life and education
Poundstone attended MIT and studied physics.

Personal life
An enthusiast of Harry Stephen Keeler, he maintains the
Keeler homepage and contributed to the anthology A to Izzard: A Harry Stephen Keeler Companion (2002).

He is a cousin of comedian Paula Poundstone.

Bibliography 
 
 
 
 
 
 
 
 
  reprints Big Secrets and Biggest Secrets
 
 
 
 
 
 
 
  Released as How to Predict Everything in the UK Description & arrow/scrollable preview. Also summarized in Poundstone's essay, "Math Says Humanity May Have Just 760 Years Left," Wall Street Journal, updated June 27, 2019. Retrieved 22 September 2020.

References

External links 

 
 
  Fortune's Formula official site
 William Poundstone's talk at Skeptics Distinguished Lecture Series (Video)

Year of birth missing (living people)
Living people
American columnists
American biographers
American information and reference writers
American skeptics
MIT Department of Physics alumni